Hyphaenieae is a subtribe of plants in the family Arecaceae found mostly in Madagascar and mainland Africa. Genera in the subtribe, all of which are monotypic, are:

Bismarckia – W Madagascar
Satranala – NE Madagascar
Hyphaene – Africa, Indian Ocean
Medemia – Upper Nile (Sudan, Egypt)

See also 
 List of Arecaceae genera

References

External links 

 
Arecaceae subtribes